Pachycondyla minuta can refer to:
Pachycondyla minuta MacKay & MacKay, 2010, synonym of Rasopone minuta
Pachycondyla minuta Dlussky & Wedmann, 2012, homonym replaced by Pachycondyla parvula